Polene is a settlement in the Municipality of Slovenske Konjice in eastern Slovenia. It lies under the northern slopes of the Mount Konjice hills west of Slovenske Konjice. The area is part of the traditional region of Styria. The municipality is now included in the Savinja Statistical Region.

References

External links
Polene at Geopedia

Populated places in the Municipality of Slovenske Konjice